Rocco Rossi (born February 6, 1962) is a Canadian businessman currently serving as president and chief executive officer of the Ontario Chamber of Commerce, and was formerly the president and CEO of Prostate Cancer Canada.

Background 
Rossi attended schools in Canada and the United States. He attended Upper Canada College (UCC). After graduating from UCC, Rossi studied at McGill University in Montreal, followed by studies at Princeton University in New Jersey, where he graduated with a master's degree in politics.

Career 
After graduating from Princeton, Rossi returned to Toronto to pursue a career in the private sector with roles at Advanced Material Resources (now NeoMaterials), the Boston Consulting Group, Torstar, Labatt/Interbrew and MGI Software. He was recruited from Torstar by Interbew and became president of beer.com.

Rossi was the chief executive officer of the Heart and Stroke Foundation of Ontario from 2004 to 2009. Under Rossi's leadership the Heart and Stroke Foundation built a $130-million reserve of tax-receipted funds. While some have criticized collecting and not using millions in funds for which tax exemptions were issued, Rossi has remarked, "It's a criticism I will bear with honour... I'm proud that we built a healthy, long-term balance sheet".

In 2013, Rossi was appointed chief executive officer of Prostate Cancer Canada.

Rossi became President and CEO of the Ontario Chamber of Commerce in 2017.

Rossi has sat on numerous boards including the United Way of Greater Toronto, AMR, the Ivey Foundation, the Internet Advertising Bureau of Canada, Toronto's 2008 Olympic Bid and the Empire Club of Canada. He currently serves as a member of the Board and Audit Committee of TerraVest Industries.

Politics 

Rossi ran for Mayor of Toronto in the 2010 Toronto mayoral election. In 2011, he won the PC nomination for the riding of Eglinton—Lawrence and ran as a candidate for MPP in the 2011 Ontario general election. Rossi is a former national director of the federal Liberal Party of Canada, and also  managed John Tory's campaign for Mayor of Toronto in the 2003 Toronto municipal election.

Personal life 
Rossi is an adventurer who has completed numerous endurance feats including walking the Camino de Santiago, which is a major Christian pilgrimage route, cycling the 1,900 km length of Yonge Street for charity, and kayaking over 500 km from Toronto to Ottawa.

In 2018, Rossi, acting as President of the Ontario Chamber of Commerce, was one of several "business leaders" who lobbied Ontario Premier Doug Ford to repeal Bill 148, legislation implemented by the previous provincial government. Among other things, that legislation guaranteed workers paid sick days, equal pay for part-time work, and a C$1/hour raise to a minimum wage of C$15/hour, to begin on January 1, 2019. Rossi publicly celebrated when Bill 148 was repealed, cancelling the planned increase of minimum wage. On December 31, 2018, the day before the cancelled minimum wage increase was to take place, Rossi tweeted photos of caviar, Veuve Clicquot champagne and pastries, with the statement "Celebrating New Year’s the 1-percenter way! Let them eat cake:-)." Rossi was roundly criticized by other Twitter users in the replies to his tweet, and has since deleted it and apologized, claiming the tweet was "satire."

References

External links

1962 births
Businesspeople from Toronto
Canadian people of Italian descent
Canadian political consultants
Living people
Ontario municipal politicians
Politicians from Toronto
Progressive Conservative Party of Ontario candidates in Ontario provincial elections
Upper Canada College alumni
Liberal Party of Canada politicians